Clas Thorulf Gille (1 May 1888 – 26 August 1952) was a Swedish pole vaulter. He competed at the 1912 Summer Olympics and finished in 12th place.

Gille was a top European pole vaulter of the 1910s. He won the British AAA title in 1913, Baltic Games in 1914, Swedish Games in 1916 and four national titles, in 1910, 1913–14 and 1916. Besides pole vaulting he competed nationally in the high jump, long jump, and in alpine ski jumping. After retiring from competitions he worked as an athletics coach from 1918 to 1927 and then as an athletic grounds supervisor. He died after being hit by a motorcycle.

References

1888 births
1952 deaths
Swedish male pole vaulters
Olympic athletes of Sweden
Athletes (track and field) at the 1912 Summer Olympics
Motorcycle road incident deaths
Road incident deaths in Sweden
People from Luleå
Sportspeople from Norrbotten County